Wang Juan (born 3 September 1975) is a Paralympian athlete from China competing mainly in category T44 sprinter events.

She competed in the 2004 Summer Paralympics in Athens, Greece where she won the gold medal in the T12 1500m and a bronze medal in the T12 800m.  She returned to the Paralympics in 2008 in Beijing, China winning one more bronze medal in the T44 100m.

Wang Juan and several other Paralympians training in Beijing acted in the 1997 Chinese film Colors of the Blind, essentially as fictionalized versions of themselves.

References

External links
 

Paralympic athletes of China
Athletes (track and field) at the 2000 Summer Paralympics
Athletes (track and field) at the 2004 Summer Paralympics
Athletes (track and field) at the 2008 Summer Paralympics
Paralympic silver medalists for China
Paralympic bronze medalists for China
1975 births
Living people
Chinese female sprinters
Chinese female long jumpers
Medalists at the 2000 Summer Paralympics
Medalists at the 2004 Summer Paralympics
Medalists at the 2008 Summer Paralympics
Paralympic medalists in athletics (track and field)
Sprinters with limb difference
Long jumpers with limb difference
Paralympic sprinters
Paralympic long jumpers
21st-century Chinese women